Nichlas Hardt (born 6 July 1988) is a Danish professional ice hockey Forward who currently plays for the Linköpings HC of the Swedish Hockey League (SHL).

Playing career
Hardt was selected Rookie of the Year in the Danish ice hockey league in 2007, where he represented the Herlev Hornets. Despite his relatively small stature, Hardt is known for his physical style of play, throwing many hits while being a relentless forechecker.

He became the first Danish player to play in the top Finnish league, the SM-liiga, when he joined Tappara towards the end of the 2007–08 season. In the playoffs, he enjoyed considerable success for Tappara, registering 4 goals and 3 assists in 11 games as Tappara went on to finish third in the playoffs and win the bronze medals.

On 16 April 2014, Hardt left Kontinental Hockey League bound Jokerit after three seasons and signed a contract with SHL club, Linköpings HC for the 2014–15 season.

International play
He represented Denmark at the 2008 World Junior Ice Hockey Championships and again at the 2008 Men's World Ice Hockey Championships and 2010 Men's World Ice Hockey Championships.

References

External links
 

1988 births
Danish ice hockey forwards
Herlev Hornets players
Jokerit players
Living people
Linköping HC players
Malmö Redhawks players
Tappara players
People from Rødovre
Växjö Lakers players
Sportspeople from the Capital Region of Denmark